Spit is the debut studio album by Canadian heavy metal band Kittie. It was originally released in limited quantities on October 19, 1999, through NG Records. After NG was bought out by Artemis Records, Spit was given a wider re-release on January 11, 2000. The album was produced by Garth Richardson, and is Kittie's only release with bassist Tanya Candler, who left the shortly after the album's release; she was replaced by Talena Atfield, who appears on the cover of all subsequent reissues of the album.  

Kittie was formed in 1996, and were signed to NG in the summer of 1999 after Jake Weiner, the record label's second-in-command, witnessed one of the band's shows. Spit was recorded in nine days at EMAC Studios in London, Ontario, and was completed in August 1999. Spit is a  album that incorporates various elements of from several heavy metal subgenres, and its lyrical themes include sexism, hatred, ignorance, betrayal, bullying and life experiences.  

Spit initially received mixed-to-positive responses from critics, who generally praised the album's aggression but criticized its song titles, lyrics and attitude. The album reached number 79 on the US Billboard 200 chart, and was certified gold by the Recording Industry Association of America (RIAA) in October 2000. As of April 2003, Spit has sold 660,000 copies in the United States. "Brackish" and "Charlotte" were released as singles to promote the album, and both became radio and MTV hits. Kittie toured internationally in support of the album, and made appearances at the Ozzfest and SnoCore festivals in 2000 and 2001, respectively. 

In the years following its release, Spit was reassessed, and is now considered to be one of the best works within the nu metal genre. It remains Kittie's best-selling album, having sold over 1.2 million copies worldwide by 2008.

Background and recording 

Kittie was formed in 1996 when drummer Mercedes Lander and guitarist Fallon Bowman met in gym class. Mercedes' sister, Morgan, became Kittie's lead vocalist and guitarist after Fallon and Mercedes jammed for several weeks; Tanya Candler completed the lineup as bassist. Kittie chose their band name because the name "seemed contradictory". Morgan said: "Usually females are perceived as being cute, fragile and feminine, like the name Kittie. The contradiction comes in, when the listener hears what our music really is about: women playing metal". Kittie performed their first show in February 1998, and recorded two demos in their hometown of London, Ontario. The owner of the studio Kittle had been recording at passed the band's demos over to producer Garth Richardson; impressed, Richardson agreed to record the band's debut album for a minimum fee, even though the group had not secured a record deal at that time. They then played Call the Office and the Embassy, and signed up for Canadian Music Week in 1999. Kittie approached Jake Weiner, second-in-command at NG Records; when he saw them play live, Weiner signed them to NG during the summer of 1999. Spit was then recorded in the space of nine days at EMAC Studios in London, Ontario during the summer of 1999. The album's total recording costs were US$57,000, and it was completed in August 1999.

According to Morgan Lander, the songs were all written when the members of the band "were 14 years old". She said that Kittie was influenced by "bands like Nirvana, Silverchair and Alice in Chains". When asked about their influences in an interview with Metal Maidens in 1999, the members of Kittie cited Nile, Today Is the Day, Placebo, Far, Weezer, Orgy, Fear Factory, Hole, Tura Satana, Human Waste Project, Babes in Toyland, Misfits, Blondie, and Nasum as influences. The band wrote the music first, as a "backdrop" to Morgan's vocals. 

During the Spit days, Kittie were viewed as an antithesis to pop music, and in particular, Britney Spears; the group were subsequently dubbed  "I'm not up there singing, 'Hit me baby, one more time!' We're a lot more mature than that," stated Morgan Lander. However, Lander also expressed annoyance at such comparisons. "[It] keeps popping up because we're in the same age range, and we happen to be the same gender. There aren't any parallels at all."

Music and lyrics

Music

Spit is a nu metal album with elements of heavy metal, speed metal, groove metal,  techno and rap. According to Exclaim!, Spit "plays like an inconsistent collection of stale 1991-era Pantera and Sepultura B-sides, overdubbed with the occasional 1995 techno sprinkle for a somewhat modern measure". The album contains heavy riffs, rapping, screaming and clean singing. According to an AllMusic review by Roxanne Blanford, the album has a "meatier, heavier sound than contemporaries Limp Bizkit and Korn". According to Michael Tedder of The Pitch, "Spit echoes Helmet's precision, Slayer's power and (with some songs dealing with body image and self-esteem issues) even Nirvana's confessional songwriting". Author Tommy Udo compared Kittie's sound and attitude to heavy metal bands such as Pantera and Machine Head.

Lyrics

The album's lyrical themes explore "hate, ignorance and sexism", and AllMusic noted its feminist lyrics. According to George Lang of The Oklahoman, "Kittie's lyrics are full of spit and venom, directed at preppy cheerleaders, rich kids, rude boys and women who trade on their sexuality". "Raven", according to the Sun-Sentinel, "was inspired by a death threat received from a male band against whom" Kittie "competed in an Ontario talent contest." "Jonny" is reportedly a reaction to male domination of women, and "Paperdoll", according to Morgan Lander, is about the degradation of women as objects. Fallon Bowman said that "Choke" is "about someone telling you that they love you so much, and they put you up on a pedestal and make you feel great, then they turn around and say 'screw you. According to Morgan Lander, "Do You Think I'm a Whore" "is about not judging a book by its cover" and the song's title was given "basically to prove people wrong". "Charlotte" was inspired by a serial killer from the book Rites of Burial by Tom Jackman and Troy Cole. "Brackish" "is a commentary on a friend of" Kittie "and the relationship that she was in at the time". In an interview with Bleeding Metal, Mercedes Lander and Fallon Bowman said the song title "Get Off (You Can Eat a Dick)" came from an incident at a school talent show when, after playing one song, a teacher didn't like what they were playing, telling them to "get off".

Mercedes Lander explained the meaning of Spit title track: "People expect us to suck, then we get on stage and blow them away." The song "Spit" was inspired by the attitude of local bands towards Kittie. According to Morgan Lander, Spit is "a dark album, but it's about every day life which isn't always peachy". According to Talena Atfield, the album's songs are about "life experiences, basically. Oppression, people mistreating us, people putting you down because you're different, giving you a hard time because of who you are", which she said she experienced or saw in school. Spit was controversial because of its song titles, which made many people think that the album's songs are about sex. In an interview with NY Rock, Atfield said that none of the album's songs are about sex.

Release and promotion 
In September 1999, bassist Tanya Candler left Kittie and was replaced by Talena Atfield. Before the release of the album, radio specialty shows and early press supported Spit, and the Kittie's profile increased following coverage of the band in Rolling Stone magazine and in an MTV News 1515 report. The album was initially released on October 19, 1999 by NG, but its production was short-lived as NG was purchased by Artemis Records shortly after. Spit was then reissued by Artemis on January 11, 2000, which featured different artwork and photographs. 

Spit was supported by two major singles, "Brackish" and "Charlotte". "Brackish", which had been receiving airplay from radio outlets since late 1999, was released as a single on the same day that Spit was re-released. The music video for the song, which features the band performing the song live at the CMJ Music Festival in New York, premiered on MuchMusic the same day; the music video then premiered on MTV by first appearing on MTV's 120 Minutes on January 30, 2000. "Brackish" continued to be played on MTV and was rotated on WAAF. Kittie also made a few appearances on TV; the group performed "Brackish" live on Late Night With Conan O'Brien on February 23, 2000, and were  interviewed and performed on the talk show Later on May 31, 2000. The single reached number 31 on Billboard's Active Rock chart. On June 5, 2000, Kittie released "Charlotte" as the album's second single, which reached number 35 on the Active Rock chart. The music video for "Charlotte", directed by Lisa Rubish, was played constantly on MTV, being one of the most played music videos on MTV during July 2000. Artemis also released two EPs in support of Spit; an four-track promotional EP featuring live versions (and respective radio edits) of the album's title track and "Suck" was serviced to radio stations on April 24, 2000, and the Paperdoll EP, featuring a remix of Spit song "Paperdoll" and some live tracks, was released on December 12, 2000.  

NG had initially pressed 8,000 copies of Spit. According to Morgan Lander, "Those 8,000 copies were gone in like the first fucking week". On January 29, 2000, Spit debuted on the  Billboard 200 chart at number 147, and two weeks later, reached number one on Billboard Top Heatseekers chart on February 19, 2000. The album later reached its peak position of number 79 on April 15, 2000. By the time the album had peaked, Spit had already sold over 100,000 copies, and by May of 2000 it had sold 236,000 copies in the United States, according to Nielsen SoundScan. The album remained on the Billboard 200 chart for 37 weeks. Spit also reached number 2 on Billboard Top Independent Albums chart, and remained on the chart for 64 weeks. On October 17, 2000, Spit was certified gold by the Recording Industry Association of America (RIAA); the album remains Kittie's only release to go Gold, and is one of only two Artemis Records albums (the other being Thug Misses by Khia) to have achieved this feat. As of April 1, 2003, Spit has sold more than 660,000 copies in the United States. 

Spit also achieved some success outside of the United States. Although Spit did not chart in the United Kingdom, "Brackish" peaked at number 46 on the UK Singles Chart on March 25, 2000 and "Charlotte" peaked at number 60 on the UK Singles Chart on July 22, 2000. The album is estimated to have sold 100,000 copies outside of the US, and has sold 40,000 copies in the band's native Canada. As of September 2008, Spit has sold 1,250,000 copies worldwide, and is their most successful album to date.

Tour 
After Spit release, Kittie toured with Slipknot and, on July 11, 2000, released the home video, Spit in Your Eye. Kittie began an American tour on April 27, 2000, with Chevelle, Shuvel and the Step Kings. Kittie then toured Europe with Suicidal Tendencies and performed at Ozzfest 2000, headlining the second stage. Morgan and Mercedes said when they were having dinner with their parents back home in Canada, they received a phone call from the representative of Ozzfest, being asked if they were interested in performing at the tour, requesting a press kit to review. When touring in England, Kittie received a phone call being told the band is officially involved in the tour. Kittie planned to tour with Pantera, but the tour fell through when Pantera vocalist Phil Anselmo fell and broke two ribs. After the Pantera tour fell through, Kittie created a headlining tour and performed at the 2001 SnoCore festival.

Critical reception 

Spit received mixed-to-positive reviews. Rolling Stone gave Spit a three out of five, called the album "fairly good-natured for an exercise in repetitive maximum aggro". Robert Christgau gave the album a C+, calling it "proof that Korn fans aren't sexist". Roxanne Blanford of AllMusic rated the album 3.5 out of five and wrote, "these young women learned well the lessons of predecessors Joan Jett, Lita Ford, and the current reigning queen of angst-rock, Courtney Love". Teen Ink gave Spit a positive review: "Kittie is a Canadian band made up of four girls who can rock, yell and keep up with any hardcore band out there". Phil McNamara of The Worcester Phoenix wrote that Kittie "can throw down heavy head-banging riffs with the best of them, and oh yeah -- they're girls". Also, Canadian journalist Martin Popoff is quite happy of a girl band which can rock "heavily and smartly", "sounding like vicious hardcore sirens" avoiding "electronic gunk" with only a slight nod to rap metal.

The Oklahoman gave Spit a positive review: "Throw in the fact that they range in age from 15 to 18, and Kittie seems like the perfect weapon to smite Mandy Moore, Britney Spears, Jessica Simpson and Christina Aguilera, forever ridding the music industry of teen-pop". The CMJ New Music Report gave Spit a positive review: "the teenage babes in Ontario, Canada's Kittie will scratch and claw their way into the dark recesses of your hearts thanks to their debut, the smashing 'n' stomping Spit". The Washington Post criticized the album: "All four members of this Canadian metal-punk band are women, which is still a novel (though certainly not unique) lineup for a headbanging ensemble. Too bad that's virtually the quartet's only distinguishing feature". The review concluded, "After four or five of these pounding rockers, Kittie becomes a bore." Exclaim! also criticized the album: "Guidance Counsellor's advice: pull the plug and stay in school". NME gave the album a four-out-of-ten rating: "Like kindred spirits System of a Down, Kittie want to give you the impression that they're just too tasty to fuk wit, too unhinged to view as normal folk, too pierced for the mainstream."

The Pitch gave Spit an "honourable mention" on their "American Top 40: Best Albums of 2000" list. Kittie also received a nominated for "Best New Group" at the 2001 Juno Awards, ultimately losing out to Nickelback.

Reappraisal and accolades 
Retrospective assessments of Spit have been more positive, and has received praise for its aggression and its cultural significance regarding the involvement of women in heavy metal and nu metal. The album, and its singles, have since appeared on several best-of lists for the nu metal genre. "Brackish" appeared on Fuse's "19 Best Nu-Metal Hits of All Time" list in 2015, and was ranked number 23 on Spin "30 Best Nu Metal Songs" list in 2017. In March 2023, Rolling Stone ranked the album's title track at number 82 on their list of "The 100 Greatest Heavy Metal Songs of All Time", calling the song "a murderously heavy proto-feminist anthem that takes aim at misogynists and lands a kill shot in under three minutes."

Track listing

Personnel 
Adapted from Spit liner notes.

Kittie
Morgan Lander – vocals, guitar
Fallon Bowman – guitar, vocals
Tanya Candler – bass, vocals
Mercedes Lander – drums
Talena Atfield – bass 

Additional musicians
DJ Dave – loops and beats on "Brackish"

Artwork
Larry Busacca – photography
Nicky Guilfoil – live shot
Michael McLaughlin – photography
Brandy Stephen – paintings
Kitten – artwork

Production and directing
Garth Richardson – engineer, producer
Rob Nation – engineer
Chris Shaw – mixing at Soundtrack Studios, New York & EMAC Studios, London, Ontario, Canada
Matt Chiaravalle – editing on "Brackish", recording and mixing on "Paperdoll"
Andrew Grimo – production assistant
Ben Kaplan – production assistant
Howie Weinberg – mastering with Masterdisk Studios, New York City, New York

Charts

Weekly charts

Year-end charts

Certifications

Release history

Notes

References 
Citations

Sources

External links 

1999 debut albums
Nu metal albums by Canadian artists
Albums produced by Garth Richardson
Kittie albums
Artemis Records albums